Das Modul was a German, public radio station owned and operated by the Bayerischer Rundfunk (BR).

References

Bayerischer Rundfunk
Defunct radio stations in Germany
Radio stations established in 2003
Radio stations disestablished in 2008
2003 establishments in Germany
2008 disestablishments in Germany
Mass media in Munich